Owen Hamilton (born 21 April 1959) is a Jamaican middle-distance runner. He competed in the 800 metres at the 1980 Summer Olympics and the 1984 Summer Olympics.

References

1959 births
Living people
Athletes (track and field) at the 1980 Summer Olympics
Athletes (track and field) at the 1984 Summer Olympics
Jamaican male middle-distance runners
Olympic athletes of Jamaica
Athletes (track and field) at the 1979 Pan American Games
Pan American Games competitors for Jamaica
People from Clarendon Parish, Jamaica